Zapoteco serrano, del sureste is a name used by INALI for a variety of Zapotec recognized by the Mexican government.  It corresponds to two ISO languages:

 Yalálag Zapotec
 Yatee Zapotec

Notes

Zapotec civilization